David Chesworth (born 1958, Stoke-on-Trent, United Kingdom) is an Australian-based interdisciplinary artist and composer. Known for his experimental and at times minimalist music, he has worked solo, in post-punk groups (Essendon Airport, Whadya Want?), electronic music, contemporary ensembles and experimental performance. He has also created installation and video artworks with collaborator Sonia Leber, such as Zaum Tractor included in the 56th Venice Biennale (2015) and This Is Before We Disappear From View commissioned by Sydney Biennale (2014).

Works
Chesworth's creative output includes music, sound art, video, installation and performance, often in collaboration with other artists. His compositions and installations have been exhibited and performed at Ars Electronica, Festival d'automne à Paris, Edinburgh Festival, BAM's Next Wave Festival, Bang on a Can Marathon, Sydney Biennale and the Venice Biennale. In 2012 he was artist in residence at the MONA Festival of Art and Music in Hobart which featured performances by the David Chesworth Ensemble and artworks made with collaborator Sonia Leber.

Chesworth's artworks and music often explore their own framing and contextual ambiguity.
Grove Dictionary of Music writes:
Chesworth’s work focuses on the social in human experience, emphasizing shared cultural spaces – how music and sounds of diverse nature interact with cultural memory and performative contexts. The direct appeal of his musical surfaces, his collaborative working methods, and the implicit critique of traditional boundaries between genres, academic and popular subcultures, and art forms in his music and art can provoke audiences who adhere to musical styles and genres.

Early in his career Chesworth coordinated the Clifton Hill Community Music Centre in Melbourne, a centre for experimental music, performance, film and video.  He performed extensively in the late 1970s and early '80s as a solo performer and with post-punk group Essendon Airport. Through Innocent Records, a label he co-founded with Philip Brophy, he released solo records that playfully deconstruct cultural tropes, including 50 Synthesizer Greats and Layer on Layer, and with the group Essendon Airport – Sonic Investigations of the Trivial and Palimpsest, and Whadya Want? – Skippy Knows. These have been reissued on CD and vinyl.

Installations:
Together with collaborator Sonia Leber, Chesworth has created a series of public art and gallery installations that 'exist significantly in the world of the imaginary'. Including 5000 Calls, a permanent 'sonic environment' for the surrounds of the Sydney Olympic Stadium for the 2000 Olympics. Other Leber and Chesworth projects include We, The Masters, a sound installation for Melbourne City Square, commissioned by Australian Centre for Contemporary Art (ACCA), We Are Printers Too, a 'speculative and archaeological' video set in the former Age Newspaper building in Melbourne. They have created public domain installations in Ljubljana, Cardiff, and New Zealand. Leber and Chesworth were the 2007 recipients of the Australian Centre for Contemporary Art's Helen Macpherson Smith Commission, for which they created the major installation work Almost Always Everywhere Apparent. Their recent major mid-career survey exhibition, Architecture Makes Us was exhibited at Centre for Contemporary Photography in Melbourne and has toured to several states including UNSW Galleries in Sydney.

Chesworth and Leber collaborated with Simeon Nelson on Proximities, a 2006 Commonwealth Games public sound-art commission for William Barak Bridge in Melbourne and Oceanic Endless for Melbourne's Cardinia Council in 2007.

Experimental Performance:
Chesworth's interest in exploring wider extra-musical contexts has led to his involvement with performance artworks and experimental opera. Insatiable, was completed in 1986. Since then he has worked with Melbourne's Chamber Made Opera (Recital, The Two Executioners and Lacuna), and with the Melbourne International Arts Festival (Cosmonaut, commissioned by Opera Australia, and Sabat Jesus). In 2010 Chesworth created the performance artwork Richter/Meinhof-Opera which was presented at Australian Centre for Contemporary Art for the 2010 Melbourne International Arts Festival and at the Art Gallery of NSW. The CD Wicked Voice containing material from various productions was released on ABC Classics.

David Chesworth Ensemble:
Chesworth is the artistic director of David Chesworth Ensemble. The ensemble has released four CDs, Exotica Suite (nominated for the ARIA Classical Release of the Year), Badlands (also released in the USA), Music To See Through, and Vanishing Tekopia. "Panopticon" from Music To See Through was awarded Instrumental Work of the Year at the APRA Classical Music Awards. The ensemble has given numerous performances including the Melbourne Festival, performances with Nick Cave and the Bad Seeds at the Forum in Melbourne. International appearances include BAM's Next Wave Festival, the Bang on a Can Marathon in New York, the Kennedy Centre in Washington, and performances in Slovenia, France and the UK, where they appeared at the Big Chill Festival.

Biography
He was born in Stoke-on-Trent, England.  Chesworth's parents moved the family from Britain to Melbourne, Australia in the late 1960s. Chesworth studied at La Trobe University, including time with composers Jeff Pressing, Warren Burt and Graham Hair. He was recently awarded a doctorate in philosophy at Monash University, for which he was awarded the Mollie Holeman Medal for research excellence. He is currently a Vice-Chancellor Research Fellow at RMIT University. He lives in Melbourne in partnership with Sonia Leber. They are directors of the company Wax Sound Media and have one daughter.

Discography 

Albums
 50 Synthesiser Greats! (as David Chesworth)
 Layer on Layer (as David Chesworth)
 Spiral Rebound (as David Chesworth)
 No Particular Place (as David Chesworth)
 Risky Business (as David Chesworth)
 Wicked Voice (as David Chesworth)
 The Unattended Serge 1978 / Five Evolutionary Things 1979 (as David Chesworth)
 Sonic Investigations of the Trivial (with Essendon Airport)
 Palimpsest (with Essendon Airport)
 Skippy Knows (with Whadya Want?)
 Exotica Suite (with The David Chesworth Ensemble)
 Badlands (with The David Chesworth Ensemble)
 Music To See Through (with The David Chesworth Ensemble)
 Vanishing Tekopia (with The David Chesworth Ensemble)

EPs and Singles
 Sonic Investigations of the Trivial (with Essendon Airport)
 The Dave & Phil Duo (David Chesworth and Philip Brophy)
 Talking To Cleopatra (with Essendon Airport)
 Industry & Leisure (as David Chesworth)

Experimental Operatic works 
1986 Insatiable: music & texts by Chesworth
1988 Recital: music by Chesworth, Puccini, Mozart et al., text by Douglas Horton and Helen Noonan, produced by Chamber Made Opera
1992 Lacuna: music by Chesworth, text by Douglas Horton, produced by Chamber Made Opera
1994 The Two Executioners: music by Chesworth, text by Douglas Horton, produced by Chamber Made Opera
2001 The Light Room: opera devised with Company in Space
2004 Cosmonaut: music by Chesworth, text by Tony MacGregor
2010 Richter/Meinhof-Opera: music and text by Chesworth, after a libretto by Tony MacGregor.

Installation Artworks
Collaborations with Sonia Leber include
  5000 Calls (2000 – ongoing) Sydney Olympic Stadium
  The Masters Voice  (2001 – 2011) The Walk Civic, Canberra
  The Persuaders  (2003) Australian Centre for the Moving Image, Melbourne
 Proximities (2006 – ongoing) at the William Barak Bridge, Melbourne
  Almost Always Everywhere Apparent (2007) Helen Macpherson Smith Commission Australian Centre for Contemporary Art, Melbourne
 Space-Shifter (2009) Conical, Melbourne
 We Are Printer's Too (2012) Melbourne Now, National Gallery of Victoria, Melbourne
 This Is Before We Disappear From View (2014) Biennale of Sydney
 Zaum Tractor (2013) 56th Venice Biennale

Awards and nominations 
Prix Ars Electronica. Honorable Mention awarded to Southgate, Chesworth's score for the opening ceremony of Southgate, Melbourne, 1991.
Churchill Fellowship. In 1997 Chesworth was awarded a travel fellowship to the US, France and UK to investigate new audio technologies.
ATOM Awards (Australian Teachers of Media). Chesworth's TV opera Insatiable won most innovative film.
ARIA Awards (Aust. Record Industry Assoc.). The David Chesworth Ensemble CD Exotica Suite was nominated for the 1994 Best Classical CD ARIA Award.
Green Room Awards. Chesworth's music and sound design for the play Life After George received a 2000 Green Room award.
The Age Performing Arts Award. Awarded to Chesworth/Horton opera The Two Executioners
The Myer Group Arts Award. Awarded to the Chesworth/Horton opera Lacuna
Substation Contemporary Art Prize, winner 2016 One from Mosta Two From Zabbar
Gold Coast Art PRize Art Prize, winner 2014 We Are Printers Too
Melbourne Prize for Urban Sculpture, finalist 2011 We, The Masters

APRA Classical Music Awards
The APRA Classical Music Awards are presented annually by Australasian Performing Right Association (APRA) and Australian Music Centre (AMC).

|-
|rowspan="3"| 2006 || "Floating World" (David Chesworth) – David Chesworth Ensemble || Instrumental Work of the Year || 
|-
| "Panopticon" (David Chesworth) – David Chesworth Ensemble ||  Instrumental Work of the Year || 
|-
| "Wait a While" (David Chesworth) – David Chesworth Ensemble || Instrumental Work of the Year ||

References

Further reading 
 Barkl, Michael. (1997).  David Chesworth.  The Oxford Companion to Australian Music (ed. Warren Bebbington).  Melbourne:  OUP.

External links
Official website
David Chesworth's records and CDs on Bandcamp 
Defining Moments: Clifton Hill Community Music Centre – ACCA (Australian Centre for Contemporary Art) Lecture Series

1958 births
Living people
APRA Award winners
Australian male composers
Australian composers
People from Stoke-on-Trent
Australian artists
La Trobe University alumni
British emigrants to Australia